The 2018–19 Northern Iowa Panthers women's basketball team represents the University of Northern Iowa in the 2018–19 NCAA Division I women's basketball season. The Panthers, led by twelfth year head coach Tanya Warren, play their home games at McLeod Center and were members of the Missouri Valley Conference. They finished the season 20–13, 12–6 in MVC play to finish in third place. They advanced to the semifinals of the Missouri Valley Tournament where they lost to Missouri State. They received an automatic bid to the Women's National Invitation Tournament where they lost to Minnesota in the first round.

Roster

Schedule

|-
!colspan=9 style=| Exhibition

|-
!colspan=9 style=| Non-conference regular season

|-
!colspan=9 style=| Missouri Valley Conference Regular season

|-
!colspan=9 style=| Missouri Valley Women's Tournament

|-
!colspan=9 style=| WNIT

See also
2018–19 Northern Iowa Panthers men's basketball team

References

Northern Iowa Panthers women's basketball seasons
Northern Iowa
Northern Iowa
Panth
Panth